Josie Janz-Dawson (born 24 February 1988) is an Australian netball player in the Netball Superleague who will play for Team Bath in 2018. She works at the David Wirrpanda Foundation in the Dare to Dream program as the project officer. 
Janz-Dawson began working at the foundation as a mentor for young Indigenous children.

Janz-Dawson was born in Thursday Island. And was raised in a small town in the Kimberley known as Derby. 
Janz-Dawson played for the Australian under 21s in Jamaica in 2009.

References
2009 West Coast Fever player profile. Retrieved on 2009-03-20.
2008 West Coast Fever team profile. Retrieved on 2008-06-13.
ANZ Championship profile. Retrieved on 2008-06-13.

Australian netball players
West Coast Fever players
ANZ Championship players
1988 births
Living people
Netball Superleague players
Team Bath netball players
Severn Stars players
Western Sting players
Australian Netball League players
Netball players from Western Australia
West Australian Netball League players
AIS Canberra Darters players
Australian expatriate netball people in England
Indigenous Australian netball players